The Southern Secondary is a rail line in New Jersey, operated by Conrail Shared Assets Operations (CSAO) from South Amboy to Red Bank, and the Delaware and Raritan River Railroad (DRR), a subsidiary of  Chesapeake and Delaware, LLC, between Red Bank and Lakewood. The entire active portion of the line is owned by NJ Transit. The active portion of the line runs from South Amboy to the current end of track at Lakewood. The line is owned by NJ Transit, but the southern portion (Red Bank, NJ to Lakewood), is not shared with passenger trains. Beyond Lakewood, the tracks are owned by CSAO as far as Lakehurst, but are inactive between Lakewood and Lakehurst.

History

Raritan & Delaware Bay and NJ Southern
The line started as part of the Raritan and Delaware Bay Railroad, and soon passed through the ownership of the New Jersey Southern Railroad to the hands of the Central Railroad of New Jersey, which took ownership of the line in 1879.

CNJ Southern Division (1879-1976)

From 1879, the line was owned by the Central Railroad of New Jersey (CNJ), which used it as their Southern Division, which, at its greatest extent, ran from Red Bank to the shores of the Delaware Bay at Bivalve and Bayside. The line hosted the CNJ's famous passenger train the Blue Comet from 1929 to 1941. The line prospered into the 1940s when, like all American rail lines and the railroads that owned them, it entered a period of decline. In 1957, the last scheduled passenger service ended on the line, leaving it as a freight-only line. Despite the sand traffic that frequented the line, the number of general freights (not including sand and local freights to serve the industries along the line) dwindled to two, JS-1 and SJ-2 as the northeastern rail scene became more grim. In 1976, Conrail took over all operations, and in 1978, it severed the line between Woodmansie and Winslow Junction, ending its use as a through route linking South and North Jersey. Within the next decade, operations would be cut back again to Lakehurst.

Conrail Shared Assets Operations (1999-present)
From June, 1 1999, the line has been operated by Conrail Shared Assets Operations (CSAO), and despite the recovering railroad state in this time frame, the line's customer base continued to dwindle, and in 2010, the line was cut back further to Lakewood. The line also included the Toms River Industrial Track (Lakehurst to Toms River), but it was placed out of service after all of the customers discontinued rail service.

Effective July 1, 2022, CSAO interchanges with the Delaware and Raritan River Railroad at Red Bank. Despite the change in common carrier service, CSAO retains trackage rights over the entire route.

Delaware and Raritan River Railroad (2022-present)
The Delaware and Raritan River Railroad assumed common carrier operations between Red Bank and Lakewood as of July 1, 2022. The DRR is responsible for serving all customers on this section of the route.

Current operations
The WPSA-31 transfers cars from Browns Yard to Red Bank, where the cars are interchanged with DRR. Once in Red Bank, DRR local RB-01 runs to Lakewood and back, servicing customers along the way. The last five customers on the line are:
Brick Recycling, Howell, receives cars to load with scrap.
Marjam Supply Company, Howell, receives drywall loads. (Uses brick recycling siding)
Laird & Company, Eatontown, receives ethanol/ethyl alcohol loads. (Uses brick recycling siding)
Extech Building Materials, Howell, receives building materials.
Woodhaven Lumber, Lakewood, receives lumber.

See also
Conrail Shared Assets Operations
New Jersey Southern Railroad
Central Railroad of New Jersey
Blue Comet
Monmouth Ocean Middlesex Line
New Jersey Transit Rail Operations#Ownership

References

External links
Archive.org
Njtransit.com
Octrainguy.rrpicturearchives.net
Rrpicturearchives.net
Railseast.com
Webspace.webring.com

NJ Transit Rail Operations
Rail infrastructure in New Jersey